Yevgeni Sergeyevich Nasedkin (born 22 January 1996) is a Russian football player. He plays for FC Saturn Ramenskoye.

Club career
He made his debut in the Russian Football National League for FC Shinnik Yaroslavl on 2 August 2020 in a game against FC Torpedo Moscow, as a starter.

References

External links
 
 Profile by Russian Football National League
 

1996 births
Footballers from Moscow
Living people
Russian footballers
Russia youth international footballers
Association football midfielders
FC Veles Moscow players
FC Zvezda Perm players
FC Shinnik Yaroslavl players
FC Strogino Moscow players
FC Nosta Novotroitsk players
FC Saturn Ramenskoye players
Russian First League players
Russian Second League players